Wolvehope is a surname. Notable people with the surname include:

 Galfridus de Wolvehope (fl. 1304–1313), English politician
 Gervasius de Wolvehope (fl. 1295–1302), English politician